Dicercoclados is a genus of flowering plants in the daisy family.

There is only one known species, Dicercoclados triplinervis, endemic to Guizhou Province in China.

References

Flora of Guizhou
Monotypic Asteraceae genera
Senecioneae